Ingrid Rothfuß (born 10 October 1948) is a German former cross-country skier who competed in the 1972 Winter Olympics.

Cross-country skiing results
All results are sourced from the International Ski Federation (FIS).

Olympic Games

World Championships

References

1948 births
Living people
German female cross-country skiers
Olympic cross-country skiers of West Germany
Cross-country skiers at the 1972 Winter Olympics